The Central District of Khomeyni Shahr County is a district (bakhsh) in Khomeyni Shahr County, Isfahan Province, Iran. At the 2006 census, its population was 282,888, in 75,305 families.  The District has four cities: Khomeyni Shahr, Kushk, Dorcheh Piaz & Asgharabad. The District has two rural districts (dehestan): Marbin-e Olya Rural District and Marbin-e Vosta Rural District.

References 

Khomeyni Shahr County
Districts of Isfahan Province